Barkcamp State Park is a public recreation area located in Belmont County, Ohio, United States, near the village of Belmont. The  state park centers around  Belmont Lake. The park offers camping including equestrian facilities, hiking and horseback trails, basketball courts, boat ramps, beach, and other recreational sites.

History
The Barkcamp Creek, the namesake for the park, once ran through the area until the dam was completed in 1963, thus reducing the outflow of water. The area once housed a logging camp where logs were stripped of bark in preparation for delivery to the mill. The Ohio Department of Natural Resources began land acquisition for the park in 1955 and developed the property into a fishing and game reserve. The park ranger once lived on the site.

References

External links
Barkcamp State Park Ohio Department of Natural Resources 
Barkcamp State Park Map Ohio Department of Natural Resources 

State parks of Ohio
Protected areas of Belmont County, Ohio
Protected areas established in 1955
1955 establishments in Ohio
Nature centers in Ohio